Joculator micalii is a species of minute sea snail, a marine gastropod mollusc in the family Cerithiopsidae. The species was described by Cecalupo and Perugia in 2012.

References

Gastropods described in 2012
micalii